The 1978 Friuli-Venezia Giulia regional election took place on 25 June 1978.

Events
Christian Democracy was by far the largest party, largely ahead of the Italian Communist Party which came second. The regionalist parties, Friuli Movement, Slovene Union and the recently formed List for Trieste (which stole many votes from the mainstream social-democratic parties), had a total score of more than 10% for the first time.

After the election Antonio Comelli, the incumbent Christian Democratic president, formed a one-party government. In 1980 he managed to enlarge his cabinet to the Italian Socialist Party, the Italian Democratic Socialist Party, the Italian Republican Party and the Italian Liberal Party (Pentapartito).

Results
Sources: Istituto Cattaneo and Cjargne Online

References

Elections in Friuli-Venezia Giulia
1978 elections in Italy
June 1978 events in Europe